Diversion Books, originally founded as a digital publisher in 2010, is an American publishing company based in New York City. It publishes titles in physical, digital, audio, and other formats. The company specializes in non-fiction (history, pop culture, sports, science, true crime, business, and more), as well as select young adult fiction and science fiction.

Notable books
Diversion Books published titles from literary icons such as S.E. Hinton, Ursula LeGuin, and Russell Baker. Recent authors include Mark Cuban, Greg and Amira Behrendt, Joe Lieberman, Walter Pincus, David Pietrusza, Rick Pitino, Geoffrey Moore, George Papadopoulos, Mark Tremonti, Mike Leach, Jon Weiderhorn, and April Daniels.

References

Publishing companies established in 2010
Online publishing companies of the United States
Ebook suppliers